Frédéric de Pasquale (28 March 1931 – 17 December 2001) was a French actor. He appeared in 50 films and television shows between 1960 and 2001.

Partial filmography

 Tourments (1954)
 La Fille aux yeux d'or (1961) - Willy (uncredited)
 La Belle Vie (1963) - Frédéric Simon
 La Famille Hernandez (1965) - Lagache
 Diamond Safari (1966) - Le routier
 Fleur d'oseille (1967) - Pierrot la veine
 Le Viol (1967) - Henri Séverin
 Ne jouez pas avec les Martiens (1967) - Job
 Le pacha (1968) - Alfred
 Tu seras terriblement gentille (1968) - Patrice Verly
 Delphine (1969) - Jean Portal
 Jeff (1969) - Diamant
 Time to Live (1969) - Louis
 Children of Mata Hari (1970) - Nicolas Baslier Krestowitz
 The Hideout (1971) - Paolo
 Ciel bleu (1971)
 The French Connection (1971) - Henri Devereaux
 The Rebels (Quelques arpents de neige) (1972) - Victor
 Quem é Beta? (1972)
 Le fils (1973) - Baptiste
 La bonne année (1973) - L'amant parisien
 Revolver (1973) - Michel Granier
 Los pájaros de Baden-Baden (1975) - Pablo
 Il soldato di ventura (1976)
 La petición (1976) - Julian
 Certaines nouvelles (1980) - Jean
 La Boum (1980) - Antoine
 Signé Furax (1981) - Le chef CRS
 Feroz (1984) - Andrés
 Le Loup de la côte Ouest (2002)

References

External links

1931 births
2001 deaths
French male film actors
French male television actors
Male actors from Paris
20th-century French male actors